Neil Anthony Murphy (born 19 May 1980 in Liverpool) is an English former professional footballer, who plays for Maghull FC, he also still works part-time as a coach for Liverpool's academy. He has represented England at under-17 and under-20 levels.

Club career

Murphy began his career as a trainee with Liverpool, turning professional in August 1999 at Liverpool, previously he had played in the same youth sides as Steven Gerrard, Michael Owen and Jamie Carragher. He joined Luton Town on loan in February 2000, but returned to Liverpool without making his debut. Released by Liverpool at the end of the season, he joined Third Division club Blackpool on a free transfer in July 2000. He made his debut on 12 August 2000 as a substitute for Mike Newell as Blackpool won 3–1 at home to Hull City.

He joined Altrincham in 2002, but played just eight times before joining Northern Premier League rivals Marine in November 2002.

He joined Kidsgrove Athletic in 2006, but broke his leg in a collision with a teammate while warming up in October 2006. He resigned for Kidsgrove in July 2007, but left to join Kendal Town during the following season. His availability became limited during the 2008–09 season due his new job as a fireman.

In June 2010 Neil joined his home town club Maghull FC who play in the West Cheshire League.

International career
Murphy made two appearances for the England national under-20 team at the 1999 FIFA World Youth Championship in Nigeria. He featured in the group stage against the United States and Japan as England failed to progress to the next round.

References

External links

1980 births
Living people
English footballers
Liverpool F.C. players
Luton Town F.C. players
Blackpool F.C. players
Altrincham F.C. players
Marine F.C. players
Kendal Town F.C. players
Kidsgrove Athletic F.C. players
Maghull F.C. players
English Football League players
Northern Premier League players
Footballers from Liverpool
England youth international footballers
Association football defenders
West Cheshire Association Football League players